The 2024 United States Senate election in Washington will be held on November 5, 2024, to elect a member of the United States Senate to represent the state of Washington. Incumbent four-term Democratic Senator Maria Cantwell was re-elected with 58.3% of the vote in 2018.

Primary election

Democratic candidates

Declared
Maria Cantwell, incumbent U.S. Senator

Republican candidates

Potential

General election

Predictions

Polling

Maria Cantwell vs. Jaime Herrera Beutler

Notes

Partisan clients

References

External links
Official campaign websites 
Maria Cantwell (D) for Senate

2024
Washington
United States Senate